Vlastimil Plavucha (born 6 November 1968) is a Slovak ice hockey player. He competed in the men's tournaments at the 1994 Winter Olympics and the 1998 Winter Olympics.

Career statistics

Regular season and playoffs
Bold indicates led league

International

References

1968 births
Living people
Olympic ice hockey players of Slovakia
Ice hockey players at the 1994 Winter Olympics
Ice hockey players at the 1998 Winter Olympics
Sportspeople from Banská Bystrica
HC Košice players
HKM Zvolen players
SCL Tigers players
HC Oceláři Třinec players
HC '05 Banská Bystrica players
Czechoslovak ice hockey right wingers
Slovak ice hockey right wingers
Slovak expatriate ice hockey players in the Czech Republic
Slovak expatriate ice hockey players in Switzerland